Jorge Antonio Azcón Navarro (born 21 November 1973) is a Spanish People's Party (PP) politician who is a city councillor (2000–2007; 2011–) and the mayor (2019–) of Zaragoza.

Biography
Born in Zaragoza, Azcón graduated in Law from the University of Zaragoza, where he also obtained a master's degree in Urban Planning. He then worked for MRA, a business involved in subsidised housing. He was the leader of the New Generations of the People's Party in the Province of Zaragoza and the region of Aragon.

When José Atarés was mayor from 2000 to 2003, Azcón was the councillor in charge of young people, and subsequently he was the party's assistant spokesman when they were in opposition to Juan Alberto Belloch. In February 2016, when the local party leader Eloy Suárez left the city hall to centre his work on the Congress of Deputies, the party unanimously chose Azcón to be the new spokesman.

In the 2019 Zaragoza election, the Spanish Socialist Workers' Party (PSOE) led by Pilar Alegría was the party that obtained the most seats, though the People's Party could gain the majority in alliance with fellow centre-right party Citizens. With the votes of his party (8), Citizens (6) and Vox (2) he was invested as the city's first non-left-wing mayor in 16 years.

Among Azcón's projects for Zaragoza is "El Bosque de los Zaragozanos", a plan to create a forest of 700,000 trees. The project received €400,000 from energy company Repsol in 2021.

In July 2021, Azcón led the city council in displaying a banner with the rainbow and transgender flags from the city hall balcony. A judge ordered its removal, citing a 2020 Supreme Court judgement that public buildings cannot fly unofficial flags at any time, for reasons of neutrality.

In August 2021, as spokesman of the Spanish Federation of Municipalities and Provinces (FEMP), Azcón led several PP mayors in criticising the PSOE-led national government whom he accused of lying over investment in municipalities during the COVID-19 pandemic.

Azcón was housebound for two weeks in January 2021 after contracting COVID-19. In December that year he was chosen as the PP's lead candidate for the next Aragonese regional election, replacing Luis María Beamonte.

References

1973 births
Living people
Politicians from Aragon
People from Zaragoza
University of Zaragoza alumni
Mayors of Zaragoza
People's Party (Spain) politicians
21st-century Spanish politicians